Phoenix Bridge is a historic metal Trapezoidal Whipple truss railroad bridge spanning Craig Creek near Eagle Rock, Botetourt County, Virginia. It was built in 1887 by the Phoenix Bridge Company of Phoenixville, Pennsylvania. It consists of rolled wrought-iron "Phoenix post" compression members and round and rectangular tension rods with pinned joints. It includes a cast panel embellished with anthemions and garlands, small urnlike finials, and quatrefoils and trefoils.

The bridge was listed on the National Register of Historic Places in 1975.

See also
List of bridges documented by the Historic American Engineering Record in Virginia
List of bridges on the National Register of Historic Places in Virginia

References

External links

Historic American Engineering Record in Virginia
Road bridges on the National Register of Historic Places in Virginia
Bridges completed in 1887
Buildings and structures in Botetourt County, Virginia
National Register of Historic Places in Botetourt County, Virginia
Wrought iron bridges in the United States
Whipple truss bridges in the United States
1887 establishments in Virginia